Meromyza americana is a fly species in the family Chloropidae. It is a pest of millets.

References

Chloropidae
Insect pests of millets